Verkin, Verkina, LaVerkin or La Verkin may refer to

La Verkin, Utah, a city in Utah, United States
LaVerkin Creek Wilderness in Utah
Hurricane-LaVerkin Bridge over the Virgin River in Utah
Verkin Institute for Low Temperature Physics and Engineering in Kharkiv, Ukraine
Kazimír Verkin (born 1972), Slovak race walker